Celebrity Undercover Boss, also known as Undercover Boss: Celebrity Edition is the ninth season of the American reality television series Undercover Boss. It premiered on May 11, 2018.

Unlike previous seasons (and contrary to its name), in Celebrity Undercover Boss the celebrities featured do not mingle with their own employees, but don a disguise to find unsuspecting talented people in their line of work. The first promotional video for the season was released on April 26, 2018.

Production
During the eighth season of Undercover Boss, CBS aired two celebrity episodes of the series. Like prior seasons, Celebrity Undercover Boss is produced by Studio Lambert in association with All3Media America, with Stephen Lambert, Sean Foley and Greg Goldman as executive producers.

Episodes
Following the announcement of the season, CBS announced the first four celebrities. Additional celebrities were announced at a later date.

References

2018 American television series debuts
2010s American reality television series
English-language television shows
Celebrity reality television series
Undercover Boss United States
CBS original programming
American television spin-offs
Reality television spin-offs
2018 American television series endings